Margareta Westeson (born 31 January 1936) is a Swedish former swimmer. She competed in the women's 400 metre freestyle at the 1952 Summer Olympics.

References

External links
 

1936 births
Living people
Olympic swimmers of Sweden
Swimmers at the 1952 Summer Olympics
Sportspeople from Malmö
Swedish female freestyle swimmers